Giovanni Grasso (11 November 1888 – 30 April 1963) was an Italian stage and film actor. He appeared in more than 80 films between 1910 and 1955. He was born and died in Catania, Sicily, Italy. Born into a family of marionettists, he was cousin and namesake of Giovanni Grasso, a respected stage actor specialized in the Sicilian language repertoire, so he assumed at the beginning of his career the stage name "Giovanni Grasso Junior" to stand out. He was mainly active on stage, often acting together with his wife,  Virginia Balestrieri.

Selected filmography

 I naufraghi (1914)
 Il lupo (1917)
 Sole! (1918)
 Il lampionaro del Ponte Vecchio (1918)
 Nennella (1919)
 Skeletros (1920)
 The Telephone Operator (1932) - Gedeone
 Port (1934) - Nicola Bellamonte
 Sentinels of Bronze (1937) - Sergente Amato
 Under the Southern Cross (1938) - Marco, il capo della piantagione
 Piccoli naufraghi (1939) - Il 'commandante'
 No Man's Land (1939) - Il puparo
 La grande luce - Montevergine (1939) - Pasquale
 Traversata nera (1939)
 Piccolo hotel (1939) - Il dottor Kralik
 Il ladro (1939) - Zio Gigio
 Los hijos de la noche (1939) - Tabernero
 Backstage (1939) - Il commissario
 La conquista dell'aria (1939) - Contadino che assiste al volo
 Il segreto di Villa Paradiso (1940) - Gorman
 L'uomo della legione (1940) - Un meccanico del cantiere
 Il signore della taverna (1940) - Il taverniere
 Mare (1940) - Liborio, il capitano
 La leggenda azzurra (1940) - Il padre adottivo di Scilla
 I pirati del golfo (1940)
 Ragazza che dorme (1941) - Marco, il padrone del mulino
 Il vetturale del San Gottardo (1941) - Mastro Antonio, il vetturale
 I Live as I Please (1942) - Il dottore
 Yes, Madam (1942) - Il commendator Bracco-Rinaldi
 Bengasi (1942) - (scenes deleted)
 We the Living (1942) - Stephan Tishenko
 Luisa Sanfelice (1942)
 Don Cesare di Bazan (1942) - Don José di Nogueira
 Madrid de mis sueños (1942) - Carlos Aguilera
 Quarta pagina (1942)
 Il fanciullo del West (1942) - Donovan
 Harlem (1943) - Guardascione
 Two Hearts Among the Beasts (1943) - Il capo-cuoco
 La carica degli eroi (1943)
 The Priest's Hat (1944) - L'avvocato Francesco Scuoto
 The Gates of Heaven (1945) - Il commerciante paralitico
 All'ombra della gloria (1945) - Il frate
 The Ten Commandments (1945)
 Chi l'ha visto? (1945)
 For the Love of Mariastella (1946) - Raìs Pietro
 The Great Dawn (1947) - Oreste Bellotti
 Bullet for Stefano (1947) - Lazzanni
 Il principe ribelle (1947)
 Eleonora Duse (1947) - impresario Schurman
 Ruy Blas (1948) - Don Gaspar Guritan
 Sono io l'assassino (1948)
 Legge di sangue (1948) - Il padre di Alberto
 Difficult Years (1948) - L'avvocato Mascali
 Vento d'Africa (1949)
 Flying Squadron (1949) - Capo Dei Contadini
 La figlia del peccato (1949) - padron Giuseppe
 Welcome, Reverend! (1950)
 Margaret of Cortona (1950) - Tancredi, padre di Margherita
 Prima comunione (1950)
 The Fighting Men (1950) - Saverio Luparello
 Fugitive in Trieste (1951)
 Tragic Serenade (1951)
 The Passaguai Family (1951)
 What Price Innocence? (1952) - suocero di Stefano
 In Olden Days (1952) - Presidente del tribunale (segment "Il processo di Frine")
 La città canora (1952) - Don Salvatore Morelli
 Immortal Melodies (1952) - Domenico Mascagni
 Una croce senza nome (1952)
 Too Young for Love (1953)
 Easy Years (1953) - L'onorevole Michele Rapisarda
 Cuore di spia (1953)
 Of Life and Love (1954) - The doorman (segment "Marsina Stretta")
 Toto and Carolina (1955) - Commissario (uncredited)
 Magic Village (1955) - Sindaco
 Onore e sangue (1957) - The Public Prosecutor

References

External links

1888 births
1963 deaths
Italian male film actors
Actors from Catania
20th-century Italian male actors